The 1998 Wimbledon Championships was a tennis tournament played on grass courts at the All England Lawn Tennis and Croquet Club in Wimbledon, London in the United Kingdom. It was the 112th edition of the Wimbledon Championships and was held from 22 June to 5 July 1998.

Prize money
The total prize money for 1998 championships was £7,207,590. The winner of the men's title earned £435,000 while the women's singles champion earned £391,500.

* per team

Champions

Seniors

Men's singles

 Pete Sampras defeated  Goran Ivanišević, 6–7(2–7), 7–6(11–9), 6–4, 3–6, 6–2
 It was Sampras' 11th career Grand Slam singles title and his 5th at Wimbledon.

Women's singles

 Jana Novotná defeated  Nathalie Tauziat, 6–4, 7–6(7–2)
 It was Novotná's 1st and only career Grand Slam singles title.

Men's doubles

 Jacco Eltingh /  Paul Haarhuis defeated  Todd Woodbridge /  Mark Woodforde, 2–6, 6–4, 7–6(7–3), 5–7, 10–8
 It was Eltingh's 6th and last career Grand Slam doubles title and his 1st at Wimbledon. It was Haarhuis' 5th career Grand Slam doubles title and his 1st and only at Wimbledon.

Women's doubles

 Martina Hingis /  Jana Novotná defeated  Lindsay Davenport /  Natasha Zvereva, 6–3, 3–6, 8–6
 It was Hingis' 5th career Grand Slam doubles title and her 2nd at Wimbledon. It was Novotná's 11th career Grand Slam doubles title and her 4th and last at Wimbledon.

Mixed doubles

 Max Mirnyi /  Serena Williams defeated  Mahesh Bhupathi /  Mirjana Lučić, 6–4, 6–4
 It was Williams' 1st career Grand Slam mixed doubles title. It was Mirnyi's 1st career Grand Slam mixed doubles title.

Juniors

Boys' singles

 Roger Federer defeated  Irakli Labadze, 6–4, 6–4

Girls' singles

 Katarina Srebotnik defeated  Kim Clijsters, 7–6(7–3), 6–3

Boys' doubles

 Roger Federer /  Olivier Rochus defeated  Michaël Llodra /  Andy Ram, 3–6, 6–4, 7–5

Girls' doubles

 Eva Dyrberg /  Jelena Kostanić defeated  Petra Rampre /  Iroda Tulyaganova, 6–2, 7–6(7–5)

Singles seeds

Men's singles
  Pete Sampras (champion)
  Marcelo Ríos (first round, lost to Francisco Clavet)
  Petr Korda (quarterfinals, lost to Tim Henman)
  Greg Rusedski (first round, lost to Mark Draper)
  Carlos Moyá (second round, lost to Hicham Arazi)
  Pat Rafter (fourth round, lost to Tim Henman)
  Yevgeny Kafelnikov (first round, lost to Mark Philippoussis)
  Cédric Pioline (first round, lost to Marc Rosset)
  Richard Krajicek (semifinals, lost to Goran Ivanišević)
  Àlex Corretja (first round, lost to Justin Gimelstob)
  Jonas Björkman (third round, lost to Jan Siemerink)
  Tim Henman (semifinals, lost to Pete Sampras)
  Andre Agassi (second round, lost to Tommy Haas)
  Goran Ivanišević (final, lost to Pete Sampras)
  Karol Kučera (first round, lost to Vladimir Voltchkov)
  Félix Mantilla (third round, lost to Sébastien Grosjean)

Women's singles
  Martina Hingis (semifinals, lost to Jana Novotná)
  Lindsay Davenport (quarterfinals, lost to Nathalie Tauziat)
  Jana Novotná (champion)
  Steffi Graf (third round, lost to Natasha Zvereva)
  Arantxa Sánchez Vicario (quarterfinals, lost to Martina Hingis)
  Monica Seles (quarterfinals, lost to Natasha Zvereva)
  Venus Williams (quarterfinals, lost to Jana Novotná)
  Conchita Martínez (third round, lost to Sam Smith)
  Amanda Coetzer (second round, lost to Naoko Sawamatsu)
  Irina Spîrlea (fourth round, lost to Jana Novotná)
  Mary Pierce (first round, lost to Elena Tatarkova)
  Anna Kournikova (withdrew before the tournament began)
  Patty Schnyder (second round, lost to Cara Black)
  Sandrine Testud (fourth round, lost to Monica Seles)
  Dominique Van Roost (fourth round, lost to Arantxa Sánchez Vicario)
  Nathalie Tauziat (final, lost to Jana Novotná)

References

External links
 Official Wimbledon Championships website

 
Wimbledon Championships
Wimbledon Championships
Wimbledon Championships
Wimbledon Championships